Leonardo A. Espina is a Filipino former police officer served as former OIC Chief of the Philippine National Police.

References 

Filipino police chiefs
Living people
1952 births